Air National Guard (ANG) units of the United States Air Force began to be mobilized in October 1950 when President Harry S. Truman issued federalization orders, bringing ANG units under federal control.  Eventually, some 45,000 Air Guardsmen, about 80 percent of the force, were mobilized.  Initially mobilized units were deployed to Far East Air Forces (FEAF) for combat operations in Korea.  Other mobilized units were deployed to Europe to reinforce United States Air Forces in Europe.

Beginning in Feb 1951, mobilized units were assigned to Air Defense Command (ADC), Strategic Air Command (SAC) and Tactical Air Command (TAC), replacing or augmenting active-duty units.  Later many ANG personnel and equipment were redeployed from their active-duty units as individual filler replacements to FEAF as required, being assigned to various combat units as replacements.  Guardsmen began to be demobilized in Jul 1952, with their units being inactivated by the active-duty air force.   Subsequently, the individual state Air National Guard bureaus re-activated and re-formed the units beginning in Jan 1953.

See also
 USAF units and aircraft of the Korean War
 Air National Guard

References

 AIR NATIONAL GUARD FLYING UNIT KOREAN WAR MOBILIZATI0NS, 1950 - 1953.   Sources: ANG Unit Date Cards, NGB-PAH, National Guard Bureau, Historical Services Division, Air National Guard Archives.
  Rosenfeld, Susan and Gross, Charles J (2007), Air National Guard at 60: A History.  Air National Guard history program AFD-080527-040
 Prelude To Total Force: The Air National Guard 1943-1969, United States Air Force General Histories. Office Of Air Force History; 1St Edition, 1985 
 Cornett, Lloyd H; Johnson, Mildred W (1980). A Handbook of Aerospace Defense Organization, 1946 - 1980. Peterson AFB, CO: Office of History, Aerospace Defense Center.
 Individual unit histories of above listed units

 

Lists of military units and formations of the United States
Air National Guard Mobilizations